Phyllonorycter antitoxa is a moth of the family Gracillariidae. It is known from Peru.

References

antitoxa
Moths of South America
Moths described in 1915